The Thornton Tunnel is a freight railway tunnel in Burnaby,  British Columbia, running under the Willingdon Heights and Vancouver Heights neighbourhoods.  It was built in 1969 by Canadian National to connect Second Narrows Bridge to the main line in Willingdon, and is 3.4 km long.

In the middle of the tunnel there is a ventilation building which is disguised as a house in a residential neighbourhood.  It is located on the northeast corner of Frances Street and Ingleton Avenue, in Burnaby.

References

Railway tunnels in British Columbia
Buildings and structures in Greater Vancouver
Transport in Burnaby
Tunnels in Greater Vancouver
Canadian National Railway tunnels
Tunnels completed in 1969
1969 establishments in British Columbia